Rose Township may refer to:

 Rose Township, Shelby County, Illinois
 Rose Township, Oakland County, Michigan
 Rose Township, Ogemaw County, Michigan
 Rose Township, Stutsman County, North Dakota, in Stutsman County, North Dakota
 Rose Township, Carroll County, Ohio
 Rose Township, Jefferson County, Pennsylvania
 Rose Township, Lyman County, South Dakota, in Lyman County, South Dakota

Township name disambiguation pages